The COSAFA Women's Championship is an association football tournament for teams from Southern Africa organized by Council of Southern Africa Football Associations (COSAFA). South Africa have won the most titles with seven wins. Zimbabwe won the 2011 edition. The next edition will take place in South Africa in September  2022.

History

Format

Results

G: Invited guest team, non COSAFA member.

Top scorers

Participating nations
Legend

 – Champions
 – Runners-up
 – Third place
 – Fourth place
 – Losing semi-finals
QF – Quarter-finals
GS – Group stage
Q — Qualified for upcoming tournament
 – Did not qualify
 – Withdrew
 – Hosts
G: Invited guest team, non COSAFA member.

See also
Africa Women Cup of Nations
COSAFA Cup

References

External links
Official website

 
COSAFA competitions
Women's association football competitions in Africa